Phases is a box set compiling the first eight studio albums by The Who, as well as the Live at Leeds album, in LP form.  This box set was released in the United Kingdom and West Germany.

Track listing
All albums are identical to their initial United Kingdom releases.

My Generation
A Quick One
The Who Sell Out
Tommy
Live at Leeds
Who's Next
Quadrophenia
The Who by Numbers
Who Are You

References

The Who compilation albums
1981 compilation albums
Polydor Records compilation albums